Imamzadeh Ja'far or Emamzadeh Ja'far may refer to:
Emamzadeh Jafar, Kohgiluyeh and Boyer-Ahmad, a village in Iran
Emamzadeh Jafar Rural District, in Kohgiluyeh and Boyer-Ahmad Province, Iran
Imamzadeh Ja'far, Borujerd, a tomb in Iran
Imamzadeh Ja'far, Damghan, a tomb in Iran
Imamzadeh Ja'far, Isfahan, a tomb in Iran
Pishva, a city in Iran